The 2022–23 season is the 119th in the history of Standard Liège and their 101st consecutive season in the top flight. The club will participate in the Belgian First Division A and the Belgian Cup.

Players

Out on loan

Transfers

In

Out

Pre-season and friendlies

Competitions

Overall record

First Division A

League table

Results summary

Results by round

Matches 
The league fixtures were announced on 22 June 2022.

Belgian Cup

References 

Standard Liège seasons
Standard Liège